The 2022 North America Talent Cup is the inaugural season of the North America Talent Cup. The season opener was held alongside the MotoGP series event, the Motorcycle Grand Prix of the Americas, at COTA and will end at MotoAmerica's final round of 2022 at Barber Motorsports Park in Alabama.
The inaugural season will feature only 20 riders, all racing on the Aprilia RS250SP2. The top two at the end of the season will be invited to join in the selection event for the 2023 Red Bull MotoGP Rookies Cup.

Calendar

Entries

Calendar

Championship standings 
Points were awarded to the top fifteen riders, provided the rider finished the race.

External links

References

Motorcycle Grand Prix of the Americas
North America Talent Cup